Berryhill may refer to:

People with the surname
Bill Berryhill, American politician and member of the California State Assembly
Bob Berryhill (born 1947), guitarist and founding member of The Surfaris
Cindy Lee Berryhill, singer and songwriter
Clare Berryhill, American politician and member of the California Legislature
Damon Berryhill (born 1963), American former Major League Baseball catcher
Frieda Berryhill, American anti-nuclear and peace activist
Tom Berryhill, American politician and member of the California State Assembly
Stanley Berryhill (born 1998), American football player

Places
Berryhill, Oklahoma, a small community, United States
Berryhill Fields, grasslands in Stoke-on-Trent, England

See also
Berry Hill (disambiguation)